Uzès Cathedral is a former Roman Catholic church located in Uzès, France. The cathedral is dedicated to Saint Theodoritus, and is now a parish church.

The church was formerly the seat of the Bishops of Uzès, until the diocese was abolished under the Concordat of 1801 and its territory passed to the Diocese of Avignon. In 1877 the territory of the former diocese of Uzès was removed from that of Avignon and added to the Diocese of Nîmes, now the Diocese of Nîmes, Uzès and Alès.

The present building, which was gutted during the French Revolution, and after repair and with the addition of a 19th-century Neo-classical façade is now used as a parish church, dates from the 17th century, and was a rebuild of the previous cathedral, which was destroyed during the French Wars of Religion. That cathedral in its turn had been built to replace a still earlier one which had been destroyed in the 12th century during the Albigensian Crusade. The campanile, the well-known Tour Fenestrelle, is the only part to survive from the medieval structure, although it was previously taller by two storeys.

Interior

Sources and external links

 Photographs: Exterior, interior

 Catholic Hierarchy: Diocese of Uzès

Former cathedrals in France
Churches in Gard